Garry Arthur Jestadt (born March 19, 1947), is a retired American Major League Baseball infielder who  played for the Montreal Expos, San Diego Padres and Chicago Cubs for all or portions of three seasons ( and –). Jestadt graduated from Frémont High School in Sunnyvale, California, and attended Arizona State University.

Jestadt was selected by the Cubs in the seventh round of the first amateur draft in MLB history in June 1965. After four seasons, during which Jestadt could not surpass the Double-A level, Montreal chose him with the 43rd pick in the October 1968 National League expansion draft. In September 1969, the Expos called him up after the minor-league season, with Jestadt going hitless in six at bats. The following April, he was traded off the Expos' Buffalo roster back to the Cubs. But his original organization gave him only a three-game, three-at-bat "cup of coffee" in April 1971 before swapping him to the Padres on May 19 for veteran catcher Chris Cannizzaro.

Jestadt then appeared in 167 Major League games played with the Padres as the club's backup second baseman and third baseman. His 118 MLB hits included 18 doubles and one triple, as well as six home runs.  He played 11 seasons of minor league baseball, as well as two campaigns in Nippon Professional Baseball (NPB).

External links

1947 births
Living people
American expatriate baseball players in Canada
American expatriate baseball players in Japan
Arizona Instructional League Cubs players
Baseball players from Chicago
Buffalo Bisons (minor league) players
Chicago Cubs players
Dallas–Fort Worth Spurs players
Florida Instructional League Expos players
Hawaii Islanders players
Lodi Crushers players
Major League Baseball second basemen
Major League Baseball shortstops
Major League Baseball third basemen
Montreal Expos players
Nippon Ham Fighters players
Nippon Professional Baseball second basemen
Nippon Professional Baseball shortstops
Nippon Professional Baseball third basemen
Phoenix Giants players
Quincy Cubs players
San Antonio Missions players
San Diego Padres players
Sportspeople from Sunnyvale, California
Tacoma Cubs players
Treasure Valley Cubs players
Vancouver Mounties players
West Palm Beach Expos players